General Pueyrredón Partido is a partido located on the Atlantic coast of Buenos Aires Province, Argentina.

The partido covers 1,453 km2 and has a population of 564,056, most of whom live in the large coastal resort of Mar del Plata.

The partido was created in 1879. The first mayor was Fortunato de la Plaza.

Name
The partido is named after Juan Martín de Pueyrredón (1776-1850), who fought in the defence of Buenos Aires against the occupation by the Royal Navy in 1806, and fought for his country again in the Argentine War of Independence. He later became a politician, serving as governor of Córdoba Province and as Supreme Director of Argentina.

Economy
The economy of General Pueyrredón Partido is dominated by the summer tourist season (December–February), when hundreds of thousands of vacationers make their way from the Gran Buenos Aires urban area to the Atlantic coast of Argentina. The other major industry is fishing. The main city of General Pueyrredón Partido, Mar del Plata, holds one of the most important fishing ports of Argentina.

Other industries include arable farming, beef and dairy farming, related agricultural industries, metallurgy and the service sector.

Districts
Mar del Plata and its resorts and suburbs
 Sierra de los Padres
 Laguna de los Padres
 Batán
 El Coyunco
 Gloria de la Peregrina
 Colinas Verdes
 El Dorado
 Santa Paula
 Las Margaritas
 Barrio 2 de Abril
 La Adela
 Santa Angela
 El Sosiego
 Los Zorzales
 Las Quintas

External links
 Municipality website
 General Pueyrredón town council
 Official page of Mar del Plata
 La Capital, local newspaper

 
1874 establishments in Argentina
Partidos of Buenos Aires Province